Edward George Smith (born 1961) is a United States district judge of the United States District Court for the Eastern District of Pennsylvania.

Biography

Smith received a Bachelor of Arts degree in 1983 from Franklin and Marshall College. He received a Juris Doctor, cum laude, in 1986 from Dickinson School of Law at Penn State University. He is a twenty seven-year veteran of the United States Navy Judge Advocate General's Corps, holding the rank of Captain and currently serves as Commanding Officer of the Naval Reserve Naval Justice School. He has served as a military trial judge and military appellate judge and earned the Bronze Star for service in Iraq without V device for valor. He began his career as an Assistant Force Judge Advocate in Norfolk, Virginia and then served as a Senior Trial Defense Counsel for two years in Philadelphia, representing Navy and Marine personnel in various matters. From 1990 to 2002, he was a partner at the law firm of DeRaymond & Smith in Easton, Pennsylvania. From 2002 to 2014, he served on the Pennsylvania Court of Common Pleas in Northampton County, handling both civil and criminal matters.

Federal judicial service
On August 1, 2013, President Barack Obama nominated Smith to serve as a United States District Judge of the United States District Court for the Eastern District of Pennsylvania, to the seat vacated by Judge Berle M. Schiller, who assumed senior status on June 18, 2012. On January 16, 2014, his nomination was reported out of committee by a voice vote. On March 13, 2014 Senate Majority Leader Reid filed a motion to invoke cloture on the nomination. On March 26, 2014, the United States Senate invoked cloture on his nomination by a 75–23 vote. He was later confirmed that same day by a 69–31 vote. Notably, he received more "aye" votes from Republican senators than from Democratic senators. He received his commission on March 31, 2014.

In August 2017, Smith upheld a Boyertown Area School District policy guaranteeing transgender students use of their preferred locker room.

References

External links

1961 births
Living people
20th-century American lawyers
21st-century American judges
Dickinson School of Law alumni
Franklin & Marshall College alumni
Judges of the Pennsylvania Courts of Common Pleas
Judges of the United States District Court for the Eastern District of Pennsylvania
Pennsylvania lawyers
United States district court judges appointed by Barack Obama
United States Navy reservists